Krakatauia is a genus of flies in the family Dolichopodidae.

Species

 Krakatauia abaca Bickel, 2008
 Krakatauia abbreviata (Becker, 1922)
 Krakatauia alanae Bickel, 1994
 Krakatauia anthracoides (Van der Wulp, 1896)
 Krakatauia auribarba Bickel, 2008
 Krakatauia barbescens (Parent, 1939)
 Krakatauia bisignata Bickel, 2008
 Krakatauia bouma Bickel, 2008
 Krakatauia cheesmanae Bickel, 2008
 Krakatauia cicia Bickel, 2008
 Krakatauia cinctiseta (Parent, 1935)
 Krakatauia claudiensis Bickel, 1994
 Krakatauia compressipes (Parent, 1939)
 Krakatauia digitula (Becker, 1922)
 Krakatauia epiensis Bickel, 2008
 Krakatauia evodevo Bickel, 2008
 Krakatauia evulgata (Becker, 1922)
 Krakatauia funeralis (Parent, 1933)
 Krakatauia graciosa Bickel, 2008
 Krakatauia hurleyi Bickel, 2008
 Krakatauia hutuna Bickel, 2008
 Krakatauia inflata (Becker, 1922)
 Krakatauia korobaba Bickel, 2008
 Krakatauia lamiensis Bickel, 2008
 Krakatauia latemaculata (Parent, 1939)
 Krakatauia luctuosa (Parent, 1928)
 Krakatauia macalpinei Bickel, 1994
 Krakatauia maculata (Parent, 1932)
 Krakatauia malakula Bickel, 2008
 Krakatauia malanda Bickel, 1994
 Krakatauia marginalis (Walker, 1861)
 Krakatauia micronesiana Bickel, 1994
 Krakatauia moanakaka Bickel, 2008
 Krakatauia namatalaui Bickel, 2008
 Krakatauia natewa Bickel, 2008
 Krakatauia navai Bickel, 2008
 Krakatauia nigrolimbata (De Meijere, 1913)
 Krakatauia nitidifacies (Parent, 1934)
 Krakatauia nupta (Bezzi, 1928)
 Krakatauia obversicornis Bickel, 1994
 Krakatauia ounua Bickel, 2008
 Krakatauia paracarbonea (Hollis, 1964)
 Krakatauia planticorum Bickel, 2008
 Krakatauia platychira (Frey, 1924)
 Krakatauia pseudofuneralis Bickel, 1994
 Krakatauia purpurascens (De Meijere, 1915)
 Krakatauia recta (Wiedemann, 1830)
 Krakatauia remota Bickel, 1994
 Krakatauia sericea (De Meijere, 1913)
 Krakatauia sigatoka Bickel, 2008
 Krakatauia solodamu Bickel, 2008
 Krakatauia tabulina (Becker, 1922)
 Krakatauia tanna Bickel, 2008
 Krakatauia tomaniivi Bickel, 2008
 Krakatauia trustorum Bickel, 1994
 Krakatauia vuda Bickel, 2008

References 

Dolichopodidae genera
Sciapodinae
Taxa named by Günther Enderlein
Diptera of Australasia